Artachaea is a genus of sea slugs, a dorid nudibranch, a shell-less marine gastropod mollusc in the family Dorididae containing only one species, Artachaea rubida.

Species
The genus Artachaea includes only one species:

Distribution
This species was described from the island of Cebu in the Philippines.

References

Dorididae
Monotypic gastropod genera